Terence 'Terry' W Glenville (October 1943 - 8 February 2021), was a male former swimmer who competed for England.

Swimming career
He represented England and won a silver medal in 440 yards medley relay, at the 1962 British Empire and Commonwealth Games in Perth, Western Australia. he also participated in the 110 yards and 220 yards butterfly events.

He was a member of the Hull Swimming Club.

After Swimming career
He was a well-respected teacher for many years at Hymers College (Junior School) in Hull, and also taught swimming at a variety of venues in the City.

Personal life
He was married to Pauline Glenville (nee Hunt - died 4 February 2017), had two children (Katy and James), and four Grandchildren (Daisy, Lucy, Jacob and Amelia).

References

1943 births
English male swimmers
Commonwealth Games medallists in swimming
Commonwealth Games silver medallists for England
Swimmers at the 1962 British Empire and Commonwealth Games
Living people
Medallists at the 1962 British Empire and Commonwealth Games